The Z27 class (formerly G.1204 class) was a class of steam locomotives built by Hunslet Engine Company for the New South Wales Government Railways of Australia.

History
Eight 'Mogul' type locomotives were built in 1913 for the New South Wales Public Works Department as railway construction locomotives, working on lines such as Coffs Harbour to Glenreagh, Glenreagh to Dorrigo and the Tumbarumba railway line between Humula and Tumbarumba.

When the New South Wales Government Railways assumed responsibility for railway construction in 1917, these locomotives were transferred and became the (G)1204 class. These locomotives were considered too modern to be utilised on construction work and were transferred to more demanding duties. However they were found to be unsuitable for working lines which abounded in curves, having a tendency to shed their valve motion on anything other than the straightest of track. They were transferred to Narrabri West where they stayed for practically the whole of their remaining lives, working to Moree, Pokataroo, Walgett, Mungindi and Boggabilla.

Preservation
The first two withdrawals occurred in 1957, a further four followed in 1963.

References

2-6-0 locomotives
Hunslet locomotives
Railway locomotives introduced in 1913
27
Standard gauge locomotives of Australia